The Kiewa Valley Highway is a minor highway of  which traverses the Kiewa Valley near the alpine regions of Victoria, Australia. In the 1950s the road was sealed and realigned to Mount Beauty to permit the transport of materials for the construction of the Kiewa Hydroelectric Scheme. From Mount Beauty the road continues as the Bogong High Plains Road, a winding and twisty route via the alpine resort of Falls Creek, which terminates at its junction with the Omeo Highway at Shannonvale south of Glen Valley.

History
The passing of the Highways and Vehicles Act of 1924 through the Parliament of Victoria provided for the declaration of State Highways, roads two-thirds financed by the State government through the Country Roads Board (later VicRoads). The Kiewa Valley Highway was declared a State Highway in the 1959/60 financial year, from Bandiana via Kiewa and Dederang to Mount Beauty (for a total of 49 miles); before this declaration, this road was referred to as the Kiewa Valley Road.

The Kiewa Valley Highway was signed as State Route 191 between Bandiana and Mount Beauty in 1986; with Victoria's conversion to the newer alphanumeric system in the late 1990s, this was replaced by route C531.

Major intersections

See also

 Highways in Australia
 Highways in Victoria

References

Highways in Victoria (Australia)